Miria may refer to:

Miria, Mali
Miria, Niger

See also
 myria-, an obsolete metric prefix.